Azi is a Romanian daily newspaper.

Azi or AZI may also refer to:

People
Azi (scribe), a scribe from the ancient kingdom of Ebla
Azi Aslanov, an Azerbaijani major-general during World War II
Azi Shahril Azmi, a Malaysian footballer
Azi Paybarah, a New York-based journalist

Other uses
Azi (clone), a term for human clones in C. J. Cherryh's science fiction universe
AZI-3, a medical droid from Kamino in Star Wars: The Clone Wars
Al Bateen Executive Airport (IATA: AZI), United Arab Emirates
Moldova Azi, a newspaper for Moldova

See also

 
 
 Azis (disambiguation)
 AZL (disambiguation)
 AZ1 (disambiguation)
 AZI1 (gene)
 Al-'Azi (אל עזי), Israel; an Arab village
 AIZ (disambiguation)